Ionuț Stoica (born 6 January 1988) is a Romanian professional footballer who plays as a defender for Liga I club FC Hermannstadt. Stoica grew up at Oltchim Râmnicu Vâlcea football academy and played at senior level for teams such as: Oltchim Râmnicu Vâlcea, CSM Râmnicu Vâlcea or CS Mioveni, among others.

Honours
Olt Slatina
Liga III: 2010–11

Damila Măciuca
Liga III: 2011–12

Hermannstadt
Cupa României runner-up: 2017–18

References

External links
 

1988 births
Living people
Sportspeople from Râmnicu Vâlcea
Romanian footballers
Association football defenders
Liga I players
Liga III players
FC Hermannstadt players
Liga II players
CSM Slatina footballers
CS Sportul Snagov players
SCM Râmnicu Vâlcea players
CS Mioveni players